The Ireland women's cricket team were scheduled to play the Scotland women's cricket team in Spain in November 2020. The tour would have consisted of two 50-over matches and three Women's Twenty20 Internationals (WT20Is). All of the matches would have been played at the La Manga Club in Cartagena, played behind closed doors, due to COVID-19 restrictions. Shortly before the scheduled tour, the Spanish government had increased restrictions in the country due to a second wave of the virus. Both teams and the match officials were scheduled to stay in the same hotel in a secure bio-environment.

However, in November 2020, the tour was called off due to the COVID-19 pandemic, after Scotland withdrew from the series. An attempt was made to reschedule to series for March 2021. However, the series was called off after the health authorities in Spain made an extension on travel restrictions on UK citizens until the end of the month. Both cricket boards expressed their disappointment at the cancellation, with the Scotland team planning to use the matches as their preparation for the 2021 ICC Women's T20 World Cup Europe Qualifier tournament.

Squads

50-over series

1st 50-over match

2nd 50-over match

WT20I series

1st WT20I

2nd WT20I

3rd WT20I

References

2020 in women's cricket
2020 in Irish cricket
2020 in Scottish cricket
International cricket competitions in 2020–21
Cricket events cancelled due to the COVID-19 pandemic